Aparichithan is a 2004 Indian Malayalam-language horror film directed by Sanjeev Sivan in his directorial debut. It stars Kavya Madhavan, Karthika and Manya in lead roles, and Mammootty in an extended cameo role. The plot centers around Ouija board and spiritualism. Music was composed by Suresh Peters.

Plot
It is the story of three carefree college friends - Minu (Kavya Madhavan), Simi (Karthika) and Devi (Manya) – who keep landing in trouble. After one such incident where Devi, the leader of the trio, is caught red-handed trying to steal question papers on the eve of exams, they have to go underground to avoid facing their peers and families.

They take the help of Chacko (Vineeth Kumar), Simi's fiancée, who arranges their stay with a woman psychiatrist (Urmila Unni) who is also an expert in "tantrik" mysticism and Ouija board, in an isolated house. Fresh trouble begins there. The landlady chases the girls out, saying a wandering soul is following them.

The girls get harassed and threatened by their college mate Jithulal. Chacko accepts the help of his friend Vinod Varghese (Siraj), who promises to take them to a guesthouse out in the woods. Vinod actually has an agenda to cheat the girls by bringing them to Jithulal. Their bus meets with an accident and they are forced to walk along the deserted road through the woods.

There they meet a mysterious wildlife photographer and a drunkard, Raghuram (Mammootty). They take shelter at an old bungalow in the forest where they have strange experiences. Ram is a nuisance throughout their journey; however, Minu makes good company with him. Ram tells her his stories. He was left only by a younger sister who went missing from Bombay which made him a drunkard and a psycho. After long treatment, Ram returned to his professional life and in one of his forest tours, he happened to visit a girl named Kalyani (Mahii Vij ) who looked exactly like his sister. He offered her to take her to Mumbai and she wholeheartedly agreed. But on the day they planned to leave, she too went missing and the aborigines accused Ram for the incident. Ram searched for her throughout the forest but on another side of the jungle she was brutally raped by
Jithu Lal. She was burnt alive by Jithulal and his friend Vinod.

The spirit of the murdered girl follows the three girls. At sunrise, Chacko and Vinod inform the police inspector (Rajan P. Dev) Ram missing, and learn that Ram already had died in the accident they earlier met with. They return to the forest house, and Minu once again tries using an Ouija board. Ram's spirit comes to them and they flee the house; they discover that Vinod was cheating them. The soul of Ram follows Vinod and kills him in a marsh.

The film ends with Minu back home, noticing activity on the Ouija board again.

Cast      
Kavya Madhavan as Meenakshi
Karthika as Simi
Manya as Devi
Mammootty as Raghuram (Extended Cameo)
Mahii Vij as Kalyani
Vineeth Kumar as Chacko
Dawn Peter as Jithulal
Siraj Musthafa Khan as Vinod Varghese
Jagathy Sreekumar as Aanamala Jolly
Rajan P. Dev as Police Officer 
Salim Kumar as Tribal Helper
Subair as Meenakshi's Elder Brother
Machan Varghese as Watchman Bhaskaran
Augustine as Cheeru
Urmila Unni as Tripura Sundari Varma
Manjulan as Ponnan
Poornima Anand as Meenakshi's Sister in Law
Deepika Mohan as College Lecturer/Hostel Warden.

Soundtrack
All songs were composed by Suresh Peters, with lyrics by Girish Puthenchery. The song "Masam Masam" was recorded within 20 minutes.

See also 
 List of Malayalam horror films

References

Indian horror films
2000s Malayalam-language films
2004 films
2004 fantasy films
2004 directorial debut films
Films scored by Suresh Peters
Indian fantasy films
2004 horror films